Thomas Hincks may refer to:

 Thomas Hincks (naturalist) (1818–1899), British Unitarian minister and naturalist
 Thomas Hincks (priest) (1808–1882), Irish Anglican priest
 Thomas Dix Hincks (1767–1857), Irish orientalist and naturalist